Ternavoli-ye Pain (also Romanized as Ternāvolī-ye Pā’īn; also known as Renāvolī-ye Soflá and Ternāvolī-ye Soflá) is a village in Maraveh Tappeh Rural District, in the Central District of Maraveh Tappeh County, Golestan Province, Iran. At the 2006 census, its population was 263, in 54 families.

References 

Populated places in Maraveh Tappeh County